Ed Packard is a 2022 Republican candidate for Alabama Secretary of State and a former  election administrator with the State of Alabama's Office of the Secretary of State.

Ed Packard is the first person in the United States to earn a Master of Public Administration degree with a specialty in election administration (1996, Auburn University).

Packard has spent nearly all of his professional career in Alabama.  His career in election administration began during his employment with Auburn University (1992-1996) where he was the lead coordinator implementing election programs through contracts with the Alabama Secretary of State's office.  From spring of 1996 to spring of 1997, he worked approximately one year for the State Board of Elections in Raleigh, North Carolina, as an education and training specialist.  In 1997, he was appointed Administrator of Elections with the Alabama Secretary of State's office.  In 2007, he was appointed Supervisor of Voter Registration and oversaw statewide voter registration programs.

In May 2006, Packard, in relation to his employment with the Alabama Secretary of State, filed an election complaint with the Alabama Attorney General alleging violation of state election laws by then-Secretary of State and Democratic primary election opponent Nancy Worley. The complaint specified that Worley illegally solicited campaign contributions from Secretary of State staff.

Packard was a candidate in the 2006 Alabama Democratic Party for the office of Alabama Secretary of State. He was defeated in that election by Nancy Worley, receiving 100,626 votes to Worley's 316,043.

In March 2013, Packard was named State Election Director in the office of the Alabama Secretary of State. In 2017, Packard was demoted from Elections Director stemming from a misprinted ballot that cost the state nearly $500,000. The demotion cites a “failure to manage assigned subordinates” and “exercising poor judgment.”

In December 2021, Packard announced his candidacy for the nomination for Alabama Secretary of State in the May 24, 2022, in the Republican Primary Election. He qualified with the Alabama Republican Party on January 6, 2022. In the May 24, 2022 Republican Primary Election, Ed Packard came in last place, receiving 7.81% of the vote.

References 

1968 births
Living people
People from Auburn, Alabama
Auburn High School (Alabama) alumni
Alabama Democrats
Alabama Republicans